TADIG code is a number uniquely identifying network operators in a GSM mobile network. The acronym TADIG expands to "Transferred Account Data Interchange Group". According to the GSM specification, the codes are used as "primary identifiers within file contents and file names" in multiple file formats defined by the GSMA. Network operators are required to register new codes and limit themselves to using code already registered with the GSMA.

TADIG codes are generally used by bilateral agreement for the purposes of billing roaming telephone calls.

Format 
A TADIG code is 5 characters long, consisting of
 Three-character country code. This is usually the ISO 3166-1 alpha-3 code for terrestrial operators. Non-terrestrial operators have the first two characters as AA. Wi-Fi operators have the first two characters as WW.
 Two-character operator/ company identifier

Example 

TADIG code: CANGW (for Freedom Mobile, formerly WIND Mobile)

TADIG code: SWE01 (for the Sweden1 bilateral Roaming Hub)

TADIG code: USAHI (for Mobi)

Notable exceptions 
The GSMA specification lists the following in their list of "known issues" as discrepancies between codes registered with them against ones actually being used
 US territories are not always represented in the USA
 YUG continues to be used as country code by operators in Montenegro and Serbia. Each now has its own ISO code, MNE and SRB respectively
 Kosovo is not recognised as a country within the ITU. As a placeholder, the value K00 is used to represent the country

References 

Mobile telecommunications
Mobile telecommunications standards